Keven Appo is a Papua New Guinean professional rugby league footballer who plays as a  and  for the Bradford Bulls in the RFL Championship and  at international level.

Career
Appo made his international debut for Papua New Guinea in their 24-18 loss to Tonga in the 2021 Rugby League World Cup.

References

External links
Hunters profile

1999 births
Living people
Bradford Bulls players
Papua New Guinea Hunters players
Papua New Guinea national rugby league team players
Papua New Guinean rugby league players
Rugby league forwards